Highway 306 (AR 306, Ark. 306, and Hwy. 306) is a designation for three east–west state highways in the Arkansas Delta. One segment of  runs from Highway 38 in Cotton Plant north to Woodruff County Road 680 (CR 680) at Becton. A second segment of  runs northeast from US Route 49 (US 49) in Hunter to Highway 284.

Route description

Cotton Plant to Becton
The route begins in Cotton Plant near the eastern terminus of Highway 38 near a junction with Highway 17. Highway 306 runs north through cotton country and the community of Shady Grove until meeting Woodruff CR 762 and CR 780, where state maintenance ends. This overlap ceases at a junction with Highway 17 at which Highway 306 begins again and runs for  before state maintenance ends again. The roadway continues as CR 680.

Hunter to AR 284

Highway 306 begins at the northern town limits of Hunter at US 49. The highway runs east to Holliday before angling northeast and entering St. Francis County. Highway 306 continues northeast, serving as the southern terminus of Highway 259 and passing through the communities of Macedonia and Pine Tree, after which the route begins to curve east. Following an intersection with the southern terminus of Highway 193, the highway intersects Highway 1 in Colt and passes the William Stone House, a property on the National Register of Historic Places. The highway exits Colt heading east and winds through forested areas. The route terminates at Highway 284 near Village Creek State Park and Summer Sweet Lake.

St. Francis River to Gieseck
Highway 306 begins at Cross CR 825, which runs parallel to the St. Francis River levee. The highway runs due east through center pivot irrigation cropland to terminate at Highway 75 at Gieseck, south of Parkin.

History
The road from Hunter east to the St. Francis county line was designated a state highway on April 24, 1963. The Highway 306 segments running north from Cotton Plant and west from Gieseck were added to the state highway system on November 23, 1966.

Major intersections

See also

Notes

References

306
Transportation in St. Francis County, Arkansas
Transportation in Cross County, Arkansas
Transportation in Woodruff County, Arkansas